Devis Vásquez (born 12 May 1998) is a Colombian professional footballer who plays as a goalkeeper for Serie A club AC Milan.

Career

Guaraní 
Having joined Guaraní in 2020, Vásquez made his league debut for Club Guaraní in February 2021 against Club Olimpia. He saved a penalty in the final match of the 2021 Clausura season against Sportivo Luqueño, and Vásquez became the undisputed number one goalkeeper for Club Guaraní in 2022 following the departure of the previously established number one Gaspar Servio on loan to Rosario Central. Vásquez played in both the league and the Copa Libertadores in 2022 for Guaraní. His form was such that he was mentioned to be in the thinking of the Colombia national football team manager for a call-up in January 2023. Part of Vázquez good form was saving penalties that knocked Club Libertad out of the semi-finals of the Paraguayan Cup on penalties.

AC Milan 
On 3 January 2023, Vásquez signed for Serie A club AC Milan on a three-and-a-half year contract.

International career 

Vásquez was called up to the Colombia national team for the friendly matches against South Korea and Japan on 24 and 28 March 2023.

Career statistics

References

External links
Profile at the AC Milan website

 

1998 births
Living people
Colombian footballers
Association football goalkeepers
Club Guaraní players
A.C. Milan players
Colombian expatriate footballers
Expatriate footballers in Paraguay
Expatriate footballers in Italy
Colombian expatriate sportspeople in Paraguay
Colombian expatriate sportspeople in Italy